Events from the year 1748 in Ireland.

Incumbent
Monarch: George II

Events
 Leinster House (at this time called Kildare House) in the unfashionable south side of Dublin is completed as a residence for James FitzGerald, Earl of Kildare by Richard Cassels.
 9 April: the Newtown Act, allowing non-resident burgesses in parliamentary boroughs, is given royal assent.

Births
22 May – Thomas Roberts, landscape painter (died 1778).
Denis Daly, landowner, MP and Mayor of Galway (died 1791).
Alexander Macomb, senior, merchant and land speculator with Macomb's Purchase in New York (died 1831 in the United States).
John Ramage, miniature painter (died 1802).
Approximate date – Henry Conwell, Catholic Bishop of Philadelphia (died 1842).

Deaths
May – Walter Blake, politician.
16 August – Sir James Somerville, 1st Baronet, politician.
29 October – Ross Roe MacMahon, Roman Catholic Bishop of Clogher, later Archbishop of Armagh (born 1698).

References

 
Years of the 18th century in Ireland
Ireland
1740s in Ireland